It's Time may refer to:

Politics
 It's Time (Australian campaign), a 1972 Australian Labor Party campaign
 It's Time (New Zealand campaign), a 1972 New Zealand Labour Party campaign
 It's Time (GetUp! ad), a 2011 Australian pro-same-sex marriage television ad

Music

Albums
 It's Time! (album), by Jack Mclean, or the title song, 1965
 It's Time (Billy Crawford album), or the title song, 2007
 It's Time (The Guess Who album), 1966
 It's Time (Jimmy D. Lane album), or the title song, 2004
 It's Time (Max Roach album), or the title song, 1962
 It's Time (Michael Bublé album), 2005
 It's Time (Sammie album), 2010
 It's Time (EP), a 2011 EP by Imagine Dragons
 It's Time (Stefanie Sun album), or the title song, 2011
 It's Time, a 1975 album by Bonnie Bramlett
 It's Time, a 1997 album by Linda Eder

Songs
 "It's Time" (song), a 2012 song by Imagine Dragons
 "It's Time", a 1990 song by The Winans featuring Teddy Riley
 "It's Time", a 1995 song from the Disney album Rhythm of the Pride Lands
 "It's Time", a 1996 song by Elvis Costello from All This Useless Beauty
 "It's Time", a 1996 song by Boyzone from A Different Beat
 "It's Time", a 2001 song by Lindell Cooley

Other uses
 It's Time, the 2012 two-part series finale of Weeds
 In Your House 12: It's Time, a 1996 World Wrestling Federation event
 "It's time!", a catchphrase of American ring announcer Bruce Buffer

See also
 Verb tense usage after the expression it's (high) time
 It's the Time, a 2007 album by Ron Carter